Karl John is a Swiss orienteering competitor. He received an individual silver medal at the 1970 World Orienteering Championships, and a silver medal in relay in 1972.

References

Year of birth missing (living people)
Living people
Swiss orienteers
Male orienteers
Foot orienteers
World Orienteering Championships medalists